Bone Quill is the sequel to Hollow Earth from sibling writing pair John Barrowman and Carole Barrowman, published in February 2013.

Plot
In this book the two young adventurers try to find the bone quill to help them in their quest along with the book of beasts to a) find their father and b) save everything.

References

External links

Official Hollow Earth website
Carole Barrowman's official website
John Barrowman's official website

2013 fantasy novels
British children's novels
British young adult novels
British fantasy novels
Novels set in North Ayrshire
Young adult fantasy novels
2013 British novels
Novels set in Glasgow
2013 children's books
2013 debut novels